The 2013–14 Missouri State Bears basketball team represented Missouri State University during the 2013–14 NCAA Division I men's basketball season. The Bears, led by third year head coach Paul Lusk, played their home games at JQH Arena and were members of the Missouri Valley Conference. They finished the season 20–13, 9–9 in Missouri Valley play to finish in a three way tie for fourth place. They advanced to the semifinals of the Missouri Valley tournament where they lost to Wichita State. They were invited to the CollegeInsider.com Tournament where they lost in the first round to Murray State.

Roster

Schedule

|-
!colspan=9 style="background:#800000; color:#FFFFFF;"| Exhibition

|-
!colspan=9 style="background:#800000; color:#FFFFFF;"| Regular season

|-
!colspan=9 style="background:#800000; color:#FFFFFF;"| Missouri Valley tournament

|-
!colspan=9 style="background:#800000; color:#FFFFFF;"| CIT

References

Missouri State Bears basketball seasons
Missouri State
Missouri State